Dynamic program analysis is analysis of computer software that involves executing the program in question (as opposed to static program analysis, which does not). Dynamic program analysis includes familiar techniques from software engineering such as unit testing, debugging, and measuring code coverage, but also includes lesser-known techniques like program slicing and invariant inference. Dynamic program analysis is widely applied in security in the form of runtime memory error detection, fuzzing, dynamic symbolic execution, and taint tracking.

For dynamic program analysis to be effective, the target program must be executed with sufficient test inputs to cover almost all possible outputs. Use of software testing measures such as code coverage helps increase the chance that an adequate slice of the program's set of possible behaviors has been observed. Also, care must be taken to minimize the effect that instrumentation has on the execution (including temporal properties) of the target program. Dynamic analysis is in contrast to static program analysis. Unit tests, integration tests, system tests and acceptance tests use dynamic testing.

Types of dynamic analysis

Code coverage 

Computing the code coverage according to a test suite or a workload is a standard dynamic analysis technique.
 Gcov is the GNU source code coverage program.
 VB Watch injects dynamic analysis code into Visual Basic programs to monitor code coverage, call stack, execution trace, instantiated objects and variables.

Dynamic testing 

Dynamic testing involves executing a program on a set of test cases.

Memory error detection 
 AddressSanitizer: Memory error detection for Linux, macOS, Windows, and more. Part of LLVM.
 BoundsChecker: Memory error detection for Windows based applications.  Part of Micro Focus DevPartner.
 Dmalloc: Library for checking memory allocation and leaks. Software must be recompiled, and all files must include the special C header file dmalloc.h.
 Intel Inspector: Dynamic memory error debugger for C, C++, and Fortran applications that run on Windows and Linux.
 Purify: Mainly memory corruption detection and memory leak detection.
 Valgrind: Runs programs on a virtual processor and can detect memory errors (e.g., misuse of malloc and free) and race conditions in multithread programs.

Fuzzing 

Fuzzing is a testing technique that involves executing a program on a wide variety of inputs; often these inputs are randomly generated (at least in part). Gray-box fuzzers use code coverage to guide input generation.

Dynamic symbolic execution 

Dynamic symbolic execution (also known as DSE or concolic execution) involves executing a test program on a concrete input, collecting the path constrants associated with the execution, and using a constraint solver (generally, an SMT solver) to generate new inputs that would cause the program to take a different control-flow path, thus increasing code coverage of the test suite. DSE can considered a type of fuzzing ("white-box" fuzzing).

Dynamic data-flow analysis 

Dynamic data-flow analysis tracks the flow of information from sources to sinks. Forms of dynamic data-flow analysis include dynamic taint analysis and even dynamic symbolic execution.

Invariant inference 
Daikon is an implementation of dynamic invariant detection. Daikon runs a program, observes the values that
the program computes, and then reports properties that were true over the observed executions, and thus likely true over all executions.

Security analysis 
Dynamic analysis can be used to detect security problems.
 IBM Rational AppScan is a suite of application security solutions targeted for different stages of the development lifecycle. The suite includes two main dynamic analysis products: IBM Rational AppScan Standard Edition, and IBM Rational AppScan Enterprise Edition. In addition, the suite includes IBM Rational AppScan Source Edition—a static analysis tool.

Concurrency errors 
 Parasoft Jtest uses runtime error detection to expose defects such as race conditions, exceptions, resource and memory leaks, and security attack vulnerabilities.
 Intel Inspector performs run-time threading and memory error analysis in Windows.
 Parasoft Insure++ is a runtime memory analysis and error detection tool. Its Inuse component provides a graphical view of memory allocations over time, with specific visibility of overall heap usage, block allocations, possible outstanding leaks, etc.
 Google's Thread Sanitizer is a data race detection tool. It instruments LLVM IR to capture racy memory accesses.

Program slicing 

For a given subset of a program’s behavior, program slicing consists of reducing the program to the minimum form that still produces the selected behavior. The reduced program is called a “slice” and is a faithful representation of the original program within the domain of the specified behavior subset.
Generally, finding a slice is an unsolvable problem, but by specifying the target behavior subset by the values of a set of variables, it is possible to obtain approximate slices using a data-flow algorithm. These slices are usually used by developers during debugging to locate the source of errors.

Performance analysis 

Most performance analysis tools use dynamic program analysis techniques.

Techniques 

Most dynamic analysis techniques are based on some kind of code instrumentation or transformation.
 DynInst is a runtime code-patching library that is useful in developing dynamic program analysis probes and applying them to compiled executables. Dyninst does not require source code or recompilation in general, however, non-stripped executables and executables with debugging symbols are easier to instrument.
 Iroh.js is a runtime code analysis library for JavaScript. It keeps track of the code execution path, provides runtime listeners to listen for specific executed code patterns and allows the interception and manipulatation of the program's execution behavior.

See also 
 Abstract interpretation
 Daikon
 Dynamic load testing
 Profiling (computer programming)
 Runtime verification
 Program analysis (computer science)
 Static code analysis
 Time Partition Testing

References 

 
Program analysis
Software testing